Greek Volleyball League Cup "Nikos Samaras" is the third domestic competition of Greek Volleyball, started in the 2011–12 season. The first League Cup was won by Foinikas Syros who are also the current League Cup holders. Since 2013, the competition is named Nikos Samaras after the great Greek Volleyball player who died suddenly in January 2013, at the age of 43.

Titles

Performance by club

References

External links
Hellenic Volleyball Federation
Olympiacos won the League Cup "Nikos Samaras" 2015
Olympiacos won the League Cup "Nikos Samaras" 2016 by beating PAOK 3-2, after an unbelievable come back
Hellenic League Cup 2016-17 review www.volleyleague.gr
News about Hellenic League Cup www.volleyleague.gr

Volleyball in Greece